Frank Evans (3 April 1897 – 30 November 1972), also known by the nickname of "Frankie Dafen", was a Welsh dual-code international rugby union, and professional rugby league footballer who played in the 1920s and 1930s.

Background
Frank Evans was born in Dafen, Carmarthenshire, and he died aged 75 in Llanelli, Carmarthenshire.

Playing career

International honours
Evans, known as 'Frankie Dafen' at his club side Llanelli, played in one international match as a rugby union player, for Wales against Scotland as part of the 1921 Five Nations Championship. In August of the same year he switched codes by joining Swinton.

Frank Evans won a cap for Wales (RU) while at Llanelli RFC in 1921 against Scotland, won caps for Wales (RL) while at Swinton 7-caps, won caps for Other Nationalities (RL) while at Swinton in 1924 against England, in 1926 against England, and won caps for Great Britain while at Swinton in 1924 against Australia (2 matches), and New Zealand (2 matches).

County Cup Final appearances
Frank Evans played , i.e. number 2, in Swinton's 15–11 victory over Wigan in the 1925 Lancashire County Cup Final during the 1925–26 season at The Cliff, Broughton, Salford on Wednesday 9 December 1925 (postponed from Saturday 21 November 1925 due to fog), and played  in the 5–2 victory over Wigan in the 1927 Lancashire County Cup Final during the 1927–28 season at Watersheddings, Oldham on Saturday 19 November 1927.

Career records
Frank Evans is one of less than twenty Welshmen to have scored more than 200-tries in their rugby league career.

References

External links
!Great Britain Statistics at englandrl.co.uk (statistics currently missing due to not having appeared for both Great Britain, and England)

1897 births
1972 deaths
Dual-code rugby internationals
Great Britain national rugby league team players
Llanelli RFC players
Other Nationalities rugby league team players
Rugby league players from Carmarthenshire
Rugby league wingers
Rugby union players from Dafen
Rugby union wings
Swinton Lions players
Wales international rugby union players
Wales national rugby league team players
Welsh rugby league players
Welsh rugby union players